This List of endangered ecological communities in NSW (or EECs) has been compiled from the indices of final determinations (made by the NSW Scientific Committee, under the TSC Act and Biodiversity Acts), and available at the NSW Office of Environment and Heritage's website. Determinations prior to 25 August, 2017 refer to the Threatened Species Conservation Act, 1995 now replaced by the Biodiversity Conservation Act, 2016.

Note that
1. This list may be incomplete;
2. Where a link has not been supplied to a final (FD) or preliminary (PD) determinations, the link given was broken (or alternatively, if the community was relisted at a later time, no iink may have been given);
3. CEEC indicates a "critically endangered ecological community".
4. VEC indicates a "vulnerable ecological community".
5. (ma) after the ecological community designation indicates that the determination is a "minor amendment".

2016

2013-2015

2011-2012

2008-2010

2004-2007
The website covering these years lists final determinations for threatened species, populations and processes, but none for endangered ecological communities.

2000-2003

1996-1999

See also
Threatened Species Conservation Act, 1995
Cumberland Plain Woodland in the Sydney Basin Bioregion

References

Endangered ecological communities